Napoleon Barleycorn was  a Primitive Methodist missionary in Spanish Guinea,  a Krio Fernandino of Igbo descent, who sent his sons to be educated at Bourne College in Quinton, England. One of his sons was William Napoleon Barleycorn, the well-known writer of the first Bube language primer.

See also
Edward Barleycorn
Edward Thaddeus Barleycorn Barber

References

Year of birth missing
Year of death missing
Fernandino people
Igbo missionaries
Methodist missionaries in Equatorial Guinea
Bubi
Equatoguinean Methodist missionaries